The European Parliament election of 2004 took place on 12–13 June 2004. The Valdostan Union was the most voted party in Aosta Valley.

Results
Source: Ministry of the Interior

2004 elections in Italy
Elections in Aosta Valley
European Parliament elections in Italy
2004 European Parliament election